Charles Cutler Torrey (20 December 1863 – 12 November 1956) was an American historian, archaeologist and scholar. He is known for, presenting through his books, manuscript evidence supporting alternate views on the origins of Christian and Islamic religious texts. He founded the American School of Archaeology  at Jerusalem in 1901.

Torrey taught Semitic languages at the Andover Theological Seminary (1892–1900) and Yale University (1900–32).

Some of Torrey's studies are included in The Origins of The Koran: Classic Essays on Islam’s Holy Book, edited by Ibn Warraq.

Books 
The Mohammedan Conquest of Egypt and North Africa (1901), based on the Arabic work of Ibn 'Abd al-Hakam, of which he subsequently published an edition (1922).
The Jewish Foundation of Islam (1933).
The Composition and Historical Value of Ezra-Nehemiah (1896)
Ezra Studies (1910)
The Chronicler's History of Israel (1954).
 In The Second Isaiah: A New Interpretation (1928), he argued that Isa. 34–35 and 40–66 should be dated c. 400 BC.
Original Prophecy (1930) presents his theory that the canonical book of Ezekiel is a revision of a 3rd-century pseudepigraphon.
The Translations Made from the Original Aramaic Gospels (1912)
The Four Gospels: A New Translation (1933)
Our Translated Gospels (1936), Torrey held that the four Gospels were Greek translations from Aramaic originals.
Apocalypse of John (1958) argues that Revelation was a translation of an Aramaic original written in AD 68.

References

External links
 The Four Gospels: A New Translation at Universal Digital Library.

1863 births
1956 deaths
20th-century American archaeologists
20th-century American historians
American biblical scholars
American male non-fiction writers
American orientalists
Fellows of the Medieval Academy of America
Scholars of medieval Islamic history